Tito, amor mijo is a novel by Slovenian author Marko Sosič. It was first published in 2005.

See also
List of Slovenian novels

References
Tito, amor mijo, Rtvslo.si, accessed 19 July 2012

Slovenian novels
2005 novels